Agent Orange is an American short silent film directed by Tony Scott. The film is about a psychedelic love story taking place in a "shadowy dreamscape". In 2004, the film was shot at 1 and 6 frames per second, noticeably altering motion and exposure. It was produced by Amazon.com's Amazon Theater.

The Orange Boy was played by Christopher Carley, and Orange Girl played by supermodel Jessica Stam. Troy Cephers played the janitor.

It was filmed on a Panavision Hollywood camera, with Eastman Kodak film.

Plot 
While waiting in a subway station, a young man catches a glimpse of a beautiful woman, dressed entirely in orange. Before he can reach her, her subway car speeds off.

The young man repeatedly visits the station, each time failing to make contact with the mysterious woman. Revealing he also wears all orange attire.

He plasters posters along the station's walls, only for them to be torn down minutes later by a janitor.

After finally giving up hope, a paper plane land in front of him. It is one of his posters. He looks up to see his dream girl. They stare at each other, before smiling.

External links 
 Watch it: QuickTime high, Windows Media high, QuickTime medium, Windows Media medium
 
 That's Advertainment! article at Slate

2004 films
2004 drama films
American silent short films
American black-and-white films
Films directed by Tony Scott
American drama films
Silent films in color
2000s American films
Silent American drama films